Kalenberg may refer to:

 The Calenberg, a hill in Lower Saxony, Germany
 Calenberg Castle, a ruined castle on the Calenberg hill in Germany
 Principality of Calenberg, a state in the Holy Roman Empire
 Kalenberg, Overijssel, a small village in the Netherlands
 Kalenberg, Drenthe, a hamlet in the Netherlands
 Josef Kalenberg (1886-1962), German opera singer (tenor)

See also
 Calenberg (disambiguation)